Blackwood Creek, is a  eastward-flowing stream originating on the southwest flank of Ellis Peak in the Sierra Nevada.

History
Blackwood Creek was named for early settler, miner and fisherman Hampton Craig Blackwood, who settled at the creek's mouth in 1866.   The area was heavily grazed and logged into the 1970s. "Blackwood Pass" at the head of the creek is named on the Wheeler Survey Report of 1876-1877.

Watershed
Blackwood Creek is the third largest stream (by area and discharge) of the 63 Tahoe Basin watersheds flowing into Lake Tahoe. The creek mainstem is paralleled by Barker Pass Road.

Ecology
Historically, Blackwood Creek once hosted native Lahontan cutthroat trout (Oncorhynchus clarki henshawi) and other native fishes and was almost as important as the Upper Truckee River to the Washoe as a fishery. It is now a critical spawning stream for Lake Tahoe's non-native rainbow trout (Oncorhynchus mykiss).

Recent evidence has shown that beaver (Castor canadensis) are native to the Sierra Nevada. Their dams do not appear to pose barriers to trout passage.

See also
List of Lake Tahoe inflow streams

References

External links
 Lower Blackwood Creek Restoration, California Tahoe Conservancy.

Rivers of the Sierra Nevada (United States)
Rivers of Placer County, California
Lake Tahoe
Rivers of the Great Basin
Rivers of Northern California
Rivers of the Sierra Nevada in California